Harry Van der Saag (born 29 October 1999) is an Australian professional footballer who plays as a right back for Adelaide United.

Club career

Sydney FC
Van der Saag first played with Sydney FC in a pre-season friendly match against Paris Saint-Germain, in which he marked French superstar Kylian Mbappé. Following the friendly, he was signed to a professional scholarship contract by Sydney FC. He made his first professional appearance for Sydney FC on 14 December 2019, coming on as a substitute in the 85th minute, replacing Alexander Baumjohann. In January 2020, he extended his contract with Sydney FC by 2 years.

International career
In November 2019, Van der Saag was called up for the Australia U-23 squad playing a series of 3 friendlies in Chongqing, China. Van der Saag made one appearance and Australia claimed the Dazu Cup, winning all 3 friendlies.

Career statistics

Honours

Club
Sydney FC
 A-League Championship: 2019–20
 A-League Premiership: 2019–20

References

External links

1999 births
Living people
Australian soccer players
Australian people of Dutch descent
Association football defenders
Sydney FC players
Adelaide United FC players
National Premier Leagues players
A-League Men players